Armen Ambartsumyan (born 18 February 1978 in Plovdiv, Bulgaria) is a former Bulgarian-Armenian football goalkeeper.

He was a member of the Armenia national team, and has participated in 8 international matches since his debut in away friendly match against Andorra on 7 June 2002.

National team statistics

References

External links

1978 births
Living people
Footballers from Plovdiv
Ethnic Armenian sportspeople
Bulgarian people of Armenian descent
Bulgarian footballers
Armenian footballers
Armenia international footballers
FC Maritsa Plovdiv players
Botev Plovdiv players
PFC Marek Dupnitsa players
PFC Slavia Sofia players
Doxa Katokopias FC players
Enosis Neon Paralimni FC players
First Professional Football League (Bulgaria) players
Cypriot First Division players
Expatriate footballers in Cyprus
Association football goalkeepers